Toby Rollox (born 19 January 1913) was a West Indian cricket umpire and player. He stood in one Test match, West Indies vs. India, in 1953. He also made five first-class appearances for British Guiana.

Rollox was an all-rounder, a left-handed batsman and slow left-arm orthodox spin bowler, who represented British Guiana sporadically between 1932 and 1951. He umpired 10 first-class matches, all at the Bourda ground in Georgetown, between 1947 and 1956.

See also
 List of Test cricket umpires
 Indian cricket team in West Indies in 1952–53

Notes

References

1913 births
Year of death missing
Guyanese cricketers
Guyana cricketers
Sportspeople from Georgetown, Guyana
West Indian Test cricket umpires